During the 2015–16 season, the Guildford Flames participated in the semi-professional English Premier Ice Hockey League. It was the 24th year of ice hockey played by the Guildford Flames and the ninth season under Paul Dixon as head coach. The club would secure the 2015–2016 'Double' with the capture of the Cup and Playoff title.

After a disappointing 2014–15 season, the Flames were quick to make changes, with the club releasing Neil Liddiard, David Longstaff, and David Savage just days after the season had ended.

Further announcements were made during the off-season with the departure of Branislav Kvetan and fellow imports – Jozef Kohut, Roman Tvrdon and Vladimir Kutny.

It was announced towards the end of April 2015, that after indicating his intention to remain at the Spectrum for the forthcoming season, netminder James Hadfield, opted instead to sign with Milton Keynes Lightning. Talking about the decision Head Coach Paul Dixon said: "I spoke with James after the season, and as far as those conversations went he was returning to the club so we had plans for him in the roster, and were in the process of getting formal items in place for that to happen.  Somewhere along the way he went a different route, and he informed us once something else was in place.  It is a disappointing turn of events, but we will immediately move on and begin the replacement search."

Joining the club roster for the 2015–16 season was Slovenian forward Matic Kralj from Kazakhstan outfit Beibarys Atyrau. He was joined at the club by the Swedish forward Jens Eriksson. The two had played together previously in their career when they were both at the French club Ours de Villard-de-Lans. Other new additions to the team were defenceman Kevin Phillips, veteran goaltender Stephen Wall, Slovak centre iceman Erik Piatak, Callum Best and Rupert Quiney.

The 2015–16 season was the first time in more than a decade that the Flames would wear a 3rd jersey. The alternate uniform debuted in the home victory over the Hull Pirates on Sunday, 13 September 2015 and made its final appearance against the Basingstoke Bison on Sunday, 8 November 2015.

Prior to the first exhibition home game of the season the supporters club held their annual pre season meet the team afternoon at Burchatts Farm Barn on Sunday, 6 September 2015 from 12 am – 2:00 pm.

It was announced in October that the Flames had added forward Andrew Melachrino to the roster. The Guildford-born skater spent his entire junior career at the club and iced 49 times with the senior side between 2009 and 2011 when he split time at Jr. and Snr. level. He spent most of his senior career at the Basingstoke Bison.

On Friday 27 November 2015 the club announced the signing of forward Lee Esders to the roster from Braehead Clan. Wednesday 15 December 2015 saw the club announce the arrival of Latvian forward Janis Ozolins from HK Mogo.

Moments after a 2–1 road win at Bracknell on 10 January, the club announced on their website, that they had made a goaltending change with the release of Stephen Wall and the signing of Richard Ullberg.

On 12 January the Flames announced that they had released Slovakian centre iceman Erik Piatak. The 29-year-old had 14 goals and 14 assists in 28 games with the club.
|}

Roster

Standings

English Premier League

[**] EPIHL League Champions. [*] Secured play-off berth

Schedule and results

Pre-season

Regular season

Playoffs
Guildford advanced to the play-off final weekend in Coventry after overturning a 2–1 deficit from the first leg to defeat Swindon Wildcats 2-0 in the second leg (3-2 on aggregate) of the quarter-final, thanks to two goals from Danny Meyers and a shut out from Richard Ullberg in front of a sold out Spectrum crowd.

References

External links
Official Guildford Flames website

Guildford Flames seasons